Bögöt is a village in Jalal-Abad Region of Kyrgyzstan. It is part of the Nooken District. Its population was 1,753 in 2021.

References
 

Populated places in Jalal-Abad Region